The 2015 Pacific Rugby League International was split into two games. The first was the Melanesian Cup between Papua New Guinea and Fiji. The second was the Polynesian Cup between Samoa and Tonga.

Results

Melanesian Cup

On 24 December 2014 it was announced that Papua New Guinea would play Fiji and Samoa would play Tonga as part of a 2015 Pacific test double header. The 2015 Melanesian Cup was played between Papua New Guinea and Fiji.

With a half-time lead of 18 points, Fiji beat Papua New Guinea to win the Melanesian Cup title by score of 22-10. Fiji's Marika Koroibete won the player of the match award, scoring 2 tries. Papua New Guinea has not won a test-match on away soil since the 2000 Rugby League World Cup.

Fiji picked 6 débutantes for the test match, while Papua New Guinea also featured six players making their first ever International appearance. Both teams had NRL, Queensland or New South Wales Cup, and domestic club players. Papua New Guinea's most experienced players were Nene MacDonald, Ray Thompson, and Tyson Martin making their 4th appearance, while Fiji's most experienced player was captain Jason Bukuya making his 10th appearance.

Papua New Guinea Hunters' Israel Eliab captained his team, and Cronulla's Jason Bukuya led Fiji.

Match details

Polynesian Cup

On 24 December 2014 it was announced that Papua New Guinea would play Fiji and Samoa would play Tonga in the 2015 Pacific test double header. The 2015 Polynesian Cup was played between Samoa and Tonga.

Samoa beat Tonga to win the Polynesian Cup title. No more than a 6-point margin separated the teams throughout the game. In the 77th minute a try-saving tackle was made on Tonga's Jorge Tafua. He attempted to dive into the corner to score his hat-trick only to be knocked into touch with a hit by Samoan forward Sam Kasiano. The Samoans won the game, 18–16.

Samoa picked two débutantes for the test match, while Tonga featured four. Both teams' players were National Rugby League-based players except for Samoa's Michael Sio, who plays for Queensland Cup team Mackay Cutters. Samoa's most capped player was Daniel Vidot who made his 10th appearance, while Tonga's most experienced player was Richard Fa'aoso who also made his 10th appearance.

Match details

ANZAC Test

The 2015 Anzac Test was a rugby league test match played between Australia and New Zealand at Suncorp Stadium in Brisbane. It was the 16th Anzac Test played between the two nations under the Super League banner since 1997. Both sides were announced on 26 April. The game was originally scheduled to take place on 1 May, but it was postponed due to weather until May 3rd.

Aftermath

On October 17, Tonga had a one-off battle with the Cook Islands in the Asia-Pacific qualifying playoff for the 2017 Rugby League World Cup. The Tongans only led by 4 at the break before running away in the second half scoring 3 tries in the last 20 minutes of the game.

Before the game Tongan coach, Kristian Woolf, noted how players eligible for second-tier nations such as Tonga and Samoa were punished if they pursued an opportunity with an Australian or New Zealand Test or Origin squad. He made the complaint after Tongan internationals Sio Siua Taukeiaho and Tuimoala Lolohea played for the Kiwis in their end-of-year test series against England. Now, Tonga can't pick these two players until a 2-year period has passed. Woolf said "Some flexibility in those rules would certainly help in terms of helping your tier two nations becoming more competitive with your first-tier nations."

Other matches

References

Pacific Rugby League International
Rugby league in Sydney
2015 in Fijian sport
2015 in Tongan sport
2015 in Papua New Guinea rugby league
2015 in Samoan sport